Carlo Arnaudi (23 May 1899 – 23 April 1970) was an Italian microbiologist and socialist politician, who served as the first minister for science of Italy and was one of the members of the Italian Senate. He is also known for his studies in the field of microbiology which produced the discovery of certain steroid-conversion processes in microorganisms.

Boography
Arnaudi was born in Turin on 23 May 1899. He worked as professor of microbiology at the University of Milan. He was the head of Istituto Microbiologia Agraria e Tecnica. In 1940, he launched a scientific journal on microbiology, namely Annali di Microbiologia. He was the major political supporter of the International Laboratory of Genetics and Biophysics (ILGB) that was founded in Naples in 1962. He also headed the Casa della Cultura in Milan.

He also served as senator. He was appointed minister for scientific research to the center-left coalition government led by Prime Minister Aldo Moro in December 1963. He proposed that the ministry should be institutionalized in order to  make it more effective in coordinating research activities. However, this proposal led to severe criticisms due to power struggle among the ministers. After serving in the post in the second cabinet of Aldo Moro, Carlo Arnaudi was removed from office in a cabinet reshuffle in February 1966. He died in Milan on 23 April 1970.

References

External links

20th-century Italian scientists
1899 births
1970 deaths
Italian microbiologists
Italian Socialist Party politicians
Government ministers of Italy
Senators of Legislature III of Italy
Senators of Legislature IV of Italy
Politicians from Turin
Scientists from Turin
Academic staff of the University of Milan
Members of the Italian Senate from Lombardy